Artem Voronin (born July 22, 1991) is a Russian professional ice hockey forward. He is currently an unrestricted free agent. He first played with HC Spartak Moscow in the Kontinental Hockey League during the 2010–11 KHL season.

References

External links

1991 births
Living people
Russian ice hockey centres
Atlant Moscow Oblast players
HC Spartak Moscow players
People from Vidnoye
Sportspeople from Moscow Oblast